The  is a Japanese high-speed Shinkansen rail line that links up with the Tōhoku Shinkansen in northern Aomori Prefecture in Honshu and continues on into the interior of Hokkaido through the undersea Seikan Tunnel. Construction started in May 2005; the initial  to  section opened on 26 March 2016. The section of the line to Sapporo is scheduled to open by fiscal year 2030. The line is operated by the Hokkaido Railway Company (JR Hokkaido).

Associated actions

Operations

Service types
Two train service types operate on the Hokkaido Shinkansen: limited-stop Hayabusa services between Tokyo or Sendai and Shin-Hakodate-Hokuto, and semi-fast Hayate services between Morioka or Shin-Aomori and Shin-Hakodate-Hokuto.

Under the initial timetable, ten return Hayabusa services operate daily between Tokyo and Shin-Hakodate-Hokuto and one return service operates daily between Sendai and Shin-Hakodate-Hokuto. One return Hayate service operates daily between Morioka and Shin-Hakodate-Hokuto, and one return service daily operates between Shin-Aomori and Shin-Hakodate-Hokuto.

Operating speed
There are approximately 50 freight trains using the dual gauge section each day, so limiting the travel of such trains to times outside of Shinkansen services is not an option. Because of this and other weather-related factors cited by JR East and JR Hokkaido, the fastest journey time between Tokyo and Shin-Hakodate-Hokuto is currently 3 hours, 57 minutes.

 
This would enable a travel time from Tokyo to Shin-Hakodate-Hokuto of 3 hours and 45 minutes, a saving of 12 minutes on the current timetable.

This would involve the extension of buffers on about 170 km of tunnels, installation of sound barriers on about 30 km of the remaining 42 km of surface track and strengthening of viaducts.

Effects of winter weather on train operation
Operating in areas that see significant snowfall during the winter months, accumulation of snow has effects on various train operations. It can cause damage to equipment or can cause a moving train to miss a switch. In particular, accretion of snow in the bogies of the train has been shown to be significant, causing damage or causing schedule delays. Methods have been used to estimate snow accumulation on trains running up to 130 km/h, and newer estimates based on weather data can predict accumulation of up to 3 cm in bogies upon arrival at a station.

The winter season also adversely impacts the occupancy rates of the rail line, with recorded occupancy reaching a low of 19% in the months of January and February.

Stations
Legend:

Rolling stock
All services are formed of 10-car JR East E5 or JR Hokkaido H5 series trainsets.

In February 2014, JR Hokkaido placed an order for four 10-car H5 Series Shinkansen trainsets for use on Hokkaido Shinkansen services from March 2016. Based on the E5 series trainsets operated by JR East since 2011, the order for 40 vehicles cost approximately 18 billion yen. The first two sets of the order are scheduled to be delivered to Hakodate Depot by road from Hakodate Port in October 2014, with test running commencing before the end of the year. The remaining two sets on order were scheduled to be delivered in 2015. The vehicles feature the usual upper green and lower white livery, with a purple stripe in the middle. The color purple was chosen to represent the purple flowers of Hokkaido: lilacs, lupine and lavender. Inside, the ordinary-class cars feature wood paneling and carpet with a snowflake motif. Green class features cream-colored walls representing the local dairy industry and carpet with a drift-ice motif. Gran class features dark blue carpets, said to be modeled after the shimmering lakes and bodies of water along the route.

History

In the early 1970s, two other Shinkansen routes were proposed for Hokkaido: Sapporo – Asahikawa (Hokkaido Shinkansen extension) and Oshamambe – Muroran – Sapporo (Hokkaido South Route). There were also further unofficial plans to connect to Abashiri, Kushiro and Nayoro/Wakkanai. These plans have been indefinitely shelved.

On 1 November 2014, a ceremony was held at Kikonai Station to mark the completion of track-laying for the line between Shin-Aomori and Shin-Hakodate-Hokuto. Test-running on the Hokkaido Shinkansen tracks within Hokkaido commenced from 1 December 2014, initially at low speeds, with the speed raised to the maximum of  later that month. Test-running was extended through the Seikan Tunnel to Oku-Tsugaru-Imabetsu in December 2014. Test-running south of Oku-Tsugaru-Imabetsu commenced on 21 April 2015, with the first train reaching Shin-Aomori Station from the north in the early hours of 24 May.

Future plans
The  extension will be approximately 76% in tunnels, including major tunnels such as Oshima, Teine and Shiribeshi.
When the section to Sapporo opens, the estimated journey time from Tokyo to Sapporo will be at most 5 hours and 1 minute, but the goal is for it to be below 4 hours.

References

External links

 JR Hokkaido: Hokkaido Shinkansen 
 Federation of Hokkaido Chamber of Commerce and Industry 
Overview of the waystations by the Yakumo City council
Shinkansen related links poseted by the Yakumo city council

 
High-speed railway lines in Japan
Seikan Tunnel
Shinkansen
Shinkansen
Railway lines opened in 2016
Standard gauge railways in Japan
2016 establishments in Japan